Jessico is the sixth album by Argentine rock group Babasónicos.

Jessico was critically acclaimed by the media and journalists, most of which considered it the band's best work. In 2007, the Argentine edition of Rolling Stone ranked it 16 on its list of "The 100 Greatest Albums of National Rock".

Track listing
 "Los Calientes" (The Horny Ones)
 "Fizz"
 "Deléctrico" (Delectric)
 "Soy Rock" (I'm Rock)
 "Pendejo" (Dumbass)
 "El Loco" (The Madman)
 "La Fox"
 "Tóxica" (Toxic)
 "Yoli"
 "Rubí" (Ruby)
 "Camarín"  (Dressing Room)
 "Atomicum"

Singles
 "Deléctrico"
 "El Loco"
 "Fizz"
 "Los Calientes"
 "Rubí"

References

2001 albums
Babasónicos albums